The 1981 New England Patriots season was the franchise's 12th season in the National Football League and 22nd overall.

Looking to improve on two consecutive winning seasons under head coach Ron Erhardt, including a 10–6 mark in 1980, the Patriots instead regressed significantly and ended the season with a record of two wins and fourteen losses, and finished tied for last in the AFC East Division with the Baltimore Colts, with whom they also tied for the worst record in the league. A porous defensive line and linebacking corps was the chief weakness: in one game against the Steelers the Patriot secondary made 27 of the team's 33 tackles. The 2–14 record resulted in Erhardt losing his job at the end of the season.

The Patriots lost their first four games, and then ten of their last eleven, including the last nine games of the season. Eight of their losses were by margins of seven or fewer points; the largest margin of defeat was only 14 points. The Patriots were defeated in both the first and last games of the season by the Baltimore Colts; the Patriots' bookend losses proved to be Baltimore's only two wins of the 1981 season. It was known that the loser of that last game would have the first pick in the 1982 NFL Draft, and the game was nicknamed “The Stupor Bowl.” With the Patriots’ defeat, the team had the first pick, choosing University of Texas defensive end Kenneth Sims, an eventual “draft bust” as first overall pick in the NFL draft. 22 years later, in their Super Bowl XXXVIII-winning season, the Patriots went 14–2, becoming the second franchise in NFL history to have both a 2–14 season and a 14–2 season.

Offseason

NFL draft

Staff

Roster

Season summary

Schedule 

Note: Intra-division opponents are in bold text.

Standings

See also 
 List of New England Patriots seasons

Notes

References 

New England Patriots
New England Patriots seasons
New England Patriots
Sports competitions in Foxborough, Massachusetts